Felix-Lev Borisovich Zbarsky  (12 November 1931 – 22 February 2016) was a Soviet Jewish painter. He was born in Moscow, the son of a biochemist . Biochemist Ilya Zbarsky was his brother, and he was the first husband of the actress Lyudmila Maksakova. He was also a husband of the Soviet model .

Biography 
Lev Zbarsky was the first son of the second marriage of Boris Ilyich Zbarsky with Evgenia Perelman. Lev was born in Moscow in November 1931. The father decided to call his son the name of the man he most respected. Since there were two men he respected most, Lev Karpov and Felix Dzerzhinsky, the son was given a double name Felix-Lev. 

In 1972, Lev Zbarsky emigrated to Israel, and from there he moved to the United States. He died in New York from lung cancer in 2016.

References

External links
 Роман с Самоваром
 Тело государственной важности

1931 births
2016 deaths
Artists from Moscow
Soviet painters
Deaths from cancer in New York (state)
Soviet emigrants to Israel
Israeli emigrants to the United States
Russian Jews
Soviet Jews